Stefan Lakić (born 12 January 1995) is a Bosnian professional basketball player for Borac Banja Luka of the Championship of Bosnia and Herzegovina and the Second ABA League.

College career 
Lakić began his collegiate career at Odessa College in Texas. He played in the 2015–16 season where he averaged 2.8 points per game as a freshman. In his sophomore year he played for Missouri State–West Plains averaging 13.9 points and 6.2 rebounds per game. In 2017, Lakić joined Samford University. As a junior, he appeared in all 32 games, including 6 starts, in the Bulldogs' 2017–18 season averaging 4.4 points and 1.8 rebounds per game. As a senior, he appeared in 31 games, including 2 starts in their 2018–19 season averaging 1.8 points and 1.7 rebounds per game.

Playing career 
Lakić grew up with Varda HE and played one season in Serbia for Sloboda Užice (2013–14) before he went in September 2015 to the United States where he planned to play college basketball. After went undrafted at the 2019 NBA draft, Lakić moved back to Bosnia where he played for Leotar (2019–20) and Mladost Mrkonjić Grad (2020–21).

In April 2021, Lakić signed a contract with Gostivar 2015 for the rest of the 2020–21 season. In June 2021, Lakić signed a contract with FMP.

National team career 
In July 2013, Lakić was a member of the Bosnia and Herzegovina under-18 national team that participated at the FIBA Europe Under-18 Championship in Latvia. Over nine tournament games, he averaged 8.6 points, 4.2 rebounds, and 1.3 assists per game. In July 2015, Lakić was a member of the Bosnia and Herzegovina under-20 national team that participated at the FIBA Europe Under-20 Championship in Italy. Over nine tournament games, he averaged 8.1 points and four rebounds per game.

References

External links 
 Profile at eurobasket.com
 Profile at realgm.com
 Profile at aba-liga.com

1995 births
Living people
ABA League players
Basketball League of Serbia players
Bosnia and Herzegovina expatriate basketball people in Serbia
Bosnia and Herzegovina expatriate basketball people in the United States
Bosnia and Herzegovina men's basketball players
KK FMP players
KK Leotar players
KK Sloboda Užice players
Junior college men's basketball players in the United States
Odessa Wranglers men's basketball players
Samford Bulldogs men's basketball players
Serbian expatriate basketball people in Bosnia and Herzegovina
Serbian expatriate basketball people in North Macedonia
Serbian expatriate basketball people in the United States
Serbian men's basketball players
Serbs of Bosnia and Herzegovina
Small forwards
Sportspeople from Užice